The 2004 Tennessee Volunteers (variously "Tennessee", "UT", or the "Vols") represented the University of Tennessee in the 2004 NCAA Division I-A football season. Playing as a member of the Southeastern Conference (SEC) Eastern Division, the team was led by head coach Phillip Fulmer, in his twelfth full year, and played their home games at Neyland Stadium in Knoxville, Tennessee. They finished the season with a record of ten wins and three losses (10–3 overall, 7–1 in the SEC), as the SEC Eastern Division champions and as champions of the Cotton Bowl Classic after they defeated Texas A&M.

Schedule

Reference:
‡ New Neyland Stadium Attendance Record

Personnel

Season summary

at Vanderbilt

Team players drafted into the NFL

References:

References
General

 

Specific

Tennessee
Tennessee Volunteers football seasons
Cotton Bowl Classic champion seasons
Tennessee Volunteers football